Rodney Lawson (born 2 December 1969) is an Australian swimmer. He competed in the men's 200 metre breaststroke event at the 1992 Summer Olympics.

References

External links
 

1969 births
Living people
Olympic swimmers of Australia
Swimmers at the 1992 Summer Olympics
Place of birth missing (living people)
Commonwealth Games medallists in swimming
Commonwealth Games silver medallists for Australia
Australian male breaststroke swimmers
Swimmers at the 1990 Commonwealth Games
20th-century Australian people
Medallists at the 1990 Commonwealth Games